Interstate 675 may refer to:
Interstate 675 (Georgia), a connection south of Atlanta, Georgia
Interstate 675 (Michigan), a loop through Saginaw, Michigan
Interstate 675 (Ohio), a partial bypass of Dayton, Ohio

75-6
6